Stacking may refer to:

Arts and media
 Stacking (video game), a 2011 game from Double Fine  
 Stacking, a 1987 TV movie directed and produced by Martin Rosen
 Stacking, a technique in broadcast programming

Language
 Consonant stacking, a feature of some South Asian writing systems
 Verb stacking, a grammatical phenomenon involving concatenation of verbs

Science and technology
 Stacking (chemistry), an attractive, noncovalent interaction between aromatic rings
 Focus stacking, an image processing technique in photography
 Image stacking, a form of speckle imaging
 Block-stacking problem, a puzzle in statics
 Stacking, a technique used in reflection seismology
 Stacking, a type of ensemble learning in machine learning
 Stacking, the assembly of a multistage rocket

Sport
 Stacking, a strategy used in the sport of pickleball
 Dice stacking, a performance art involving dice
 Sport stacking, played using plastic cups
 Stacking guard pass, a technique in grappling

Other uses
 Stacking, a gang signal made with the hands
 Stacking, a phenomenon where amusement ride vehicles stop and "pile up" due to the track ahead being occupied

See also
 
 
 Sphere packing
 Stack (disambiguation)
 Stacker (disambiguation)
 piling (disambiguation)